Forgotten, is a 2012 Taiwanese television film. Starring Ruby Lin alongside Christopher Lee, it is the first television film produced by Lin. It first aired on the Public Television Service (PTS) on 26 May 2012.

Cast

Plot summary
Wei'an (Ruby Lin) and Pinzhong (Christopher Lee)'s marriage start to fall apart due to the lack of communication and personality differences. When Wei'an goes to meet Pinzhong for the couple's divorce negotiation, only to find the presence of his former lover, she storms out and gets hit in a traffic accident. Wei'an survives with some unexpected side effects: she has lost her memory, and reverted to the simple, endearing woman she was 10 years ago, reminding why he loved her in the first place...

Production 
Because of budget limitations, production started with only one-month preparation and a three-man team. Some of the scenes were shot in Lin Sun Hospital, Yang Ming Hospital, and an enclosed section of Siwei Road. The television film was produced and was aiming for the Taiwan Golden Bell Awards.

Awards and nominations

References

External links

  official site on Tudou

2012 television films
2012 films
2010s Mandarin-language films
2012 romantic drama films
Taiwanese television films
Films directed by Lien Yi-chi